In meteoritics, a meteorite classification system attempts to group similar meteorites and allows scientists to communicate with a standardized terminology when discussing them. Meteorites are classified according to a variety of characteristics, especially mineralogical, petrological, chemical, and isotopic properties.

Terminology
There is no single, standardized terminology used in meteorite classification; however, commonly used terms for categories include types, classes, clans, groups, and subgroups. Some researchers hierarchize these terms, but there is no consensus as to which hierarchy is most appropriate. Meteorites that do not fit any known group (though they may fit somewhere within a higher level of classification) are ungrouped.

Genetic relationships
Meteorite classification may indicate that a "genetic" relationship exists between similar meteorite specimens. Similarly classified meteorites may share a common origin, and therefore may come from the same astronomical object (such as a planet, asteroid, or moon) known as a parent body. However, with current scientific knowledge, these types of relationships between meteorites are difficult to prove.

Traditional classification scheme
Meteorites are often divided into three overall categories based on whether they are dominantly composed of rocky material (stony meteorites), metallic material (iron meteorites), or mixtures (stony–iron meteorites).  These categories have been in use since at least the early 19th century but do not have much genetic significance; they are simply a traditional and convenient way of grouping specimens.  In fact, the term "stony iron" is a misnomer as currently used. One group of chondrites (CB) has over 50% metal by volume and contains meteorites that were called stony irons until their affinities with chondrites were recognized.  Some iron meteorites also contain many silicate inclusions but are rarely described as stony irons.

Nevertheless, these three categories sit at the top of the most widely used meteorite classification system. Stony meteorites are then traditionally divided into two other categories: chondrites (groups of meteorites that have undergone little change since their parent bodies originally formed and are characterized by the presence of chondrules), and achondrites (groups of meteorites that have a complex origin involving asteroidal or planetary differentiation).  The iron meteorites were traditionally divided into objects with similar internal structures (octahedrites, hexahedrites, and ataxites), but these terms are now used for purely descriptive purposes and have given way to modern chemical groups.  Stony–iron meteorites have always been divided into pallasites (which are now known to comprise several distinct groups) and mesosiderites (a textural term that is also synonymous with the name of a modern group).

Below is a representation of how the meteorite groups fit into the more traditional classification hierarchy: 

 Chondrites
 Carbonaceous chondrite class
 CI chondrites (Ivuna-like) group
 CM-CO chondrite (mini-chondrule) clan
 CM chondrite (Mighei-like) group
 CO chondrite (Ornans-like) group
 CV-CK chondrite clan
 CV chondrite (Vigarano-like) group
 CV-oxA chondrite (oxidized, Allende-like) subgroup
 CV-oxB chondrite (oxidized, Bali-like) subgroup
 CV-red chondrite (reduced) subgroup
 CK chondrite (Karoonda-like) group
 CR chondrite clan
 CR chondrite (Renazzo-like) group
 CH chondrite (Allan Hills 85085-like) group
 CB chondrite (Bencubbin-like) group
 CBa chondrite subgroup
 CBb chondrite subgroup
 Ordinary chondrite class
 H chondrite group
 L chondrite group
 LL chondrite group
 Enstatite chondrite class
 EH chondrite group
 EL chondrite group
Other chondrite groups, not in one of the major classes
 R chondrite (Rumuruti-like) group
 K chondrite (Kakangari-like) grouplet (a grouplet is a provisional group with <5 members)
 Achondrites
 Primitive achondrites
 Acapulcoite group
 Lodranite group
 Winonaite group
 Asteroidal achondrites
 HED meteorite clan (possibly from asteroid 4 Vesta, also called basaltic achondrites)
 Howardite group
 Eucrite group
 Diogenite group
 Angrite group
 Aubrite group (enstatite achondrites)
 Ureilite group
 Brachinite group
 Lunar meteorite group
 Martian meteorite group (sometimes called "SNC meteorites")
 Shergottites
 Nakhlites
 Chassignites
 Other Martian meteorites, e.g., ALH84001

 Pallasites
 Main group pallasites
 Eagle station pallasite grouplet
 Pyroxene pallasite grouplet
 Mesosiderite group

 Magmatic iron meteorite groups
 IC iron meteorite group
 IIAB iron meteorite group
 IIC iron meteorite group
 IID iron meteorite group
 IIF iron meteorite group
 IIG iron meteorite group
 IIIAB iron meteorite group
 IIIE iron meteorite group
 IIIF iron meteorite group
 IVA iron meteorite group
 IVB iron meteorite group
 "Non-magmatic" or primitive iron meteorite groups
 IAB iron meteorite "complex" or clan (formerly groups IAB and IIICD)
 IAB main group
 Udei Station grouplet
 Pitts grouplet
 sLL (low Au, Low Ni) subgroup
 sLM (low Au, Medium Ni) subgroup
 sLH (low Au, high Ni) subgroup
 sHL (high Au, Low Ni) subgroup
 sHH (high Au, high Ni) subgroup
 IIE iron meteorite group

Rubin classification
A. E. Rubin (2000) classification scheme:

Alternative schemes

Two alternative general classification schemes were recently published, illustrating the lack of consensus on how to classify meteorites beyond the level of groups. In the Krot et al. scheme (2003) the following hierarchy is used:

 Chondrites
 Nonchondrites
 Primitive
 Differentiated
 Achondrites
 Stony irons
 Irons

In the Weisberg et al. (2006) scheme meteorites groups are arranged as follows:

 Chondrites
 Primitive achondrites
 Achondrites

where irons and stony–irons are considered to be achondrites or primitive achondrites, depending on the group.

History
Modern meteorite classification was worked out in the 1860s, based on Gustav Rose's and Nevil Story Maskelyne's classifications. Gustav Rose worked on the meteorite collection of the Museum für Naturkunde, Berlin and Maskelyne on the collection of the British Museum, London. Rose was the first to make different categories for meteorites with chondrules (chondrites) and without (nonchondrites). Story-Maskelyne differentiated between siderites, siderolites and aerolites (now called iron meteorites, stony-iron meteorites and stony meteorite, respectively).

In 1872 Gustav Tschermak published his first meteorite classification based on Gustav Rose's catalog from 1864:

In 1883 Tschermak modified Rose's classification again.

Further modifications were made by Aristides Brezina.

The first chemical classification was published by Oliver C. Farrington, 1907.

George Thurland Prior further improved the classification based on mineralogical and chemical data, introducing the terms mesosiderite, lodranite and enstatite chondrite. In 1923 he published a catalogue of the meteorites in the Natural History Museum (London). He describes his classification as based on Gustav Tschermak and Aristides Brezina with modifications by himself. His main subdivisions were:
 Meteoric Irons or Siderites
 Meteoric Stony-irons or Siderolites
 Meteoric Stones or Aerolites.
He subdivides the "Meteoric Stones" into those that have chondrules (Chondritic Meteoric Stones or Chondrites) and those that don't (Non-chondritic Meteoric Stones or Achondrites). The iron meteorites are subdivided according to their structures as ataxites, hexahedrites and octahedrites. A complete overview of his classification is given in the box below:

Brian Harold Mason published a further revision in the 1960s.

See also
 Glossary of meteoritics
 Asteroid spectral types

References

External links
 Meteorite frequencies by group - National History Museum
 Meteorite "family tree" - National History Museum
 Meteorite Classification List - Meteorites Australia

 

it:Meteorite#Classificazione